The 1869 Christchurch earthquake occurred at 8:00 am on 5 June, near New Brighton, with an estimated Richter magnitude of 6.0. The shock had a Mercalli Intensity of VII–VIII.

The shock damaged several brick and stone buildings in the city, destroying chimneys and damaging the spire of St John's church in Hereford Street.

The effects of the earthquake on stone buildings such as St. Johns prompted the Church of St Michael and All Angels to be built using timber.

See also
2010 Canterbury earthquake
2011 Christchurch earthquake
2016 Kaikōura earthquake
List of earthquakes in New Zealand
List of historical earthquakes
List of tsunamis affecting New Zealand

References

Christchurch 1869
Christchurch earthquake
History of Canterbury, New Zealand
1869 Christchurch 1869
1860s in Christchurch
June 1869 events
1869 disasters in New Zealand